KWPK-FM (104.1 MHz) is a commercial modern adult contemporary music radio station in Sisters, Oregon, USA, broadcasting to the Bend, Oregon area.

External links
Official Website

References

WPK-FM
Modern adult contemporary radio stations
Sisters, Oregon
Radio stations established in 2001
2001 establishments in Oregon